Catabena is a genus of moths of the family Noctuidae.

Species
 Catabena lineolata Walker, 1865
 Catabena sagittata Barnes & McDunnough, 1913

Former species
 Catabena pronuba is now Supralathosea pronuba Barnes & McDunnough, 1916

References
 Catabaena at Markku Savela's Lepidoptera and Some Other Life Forms
 Natural History Museum Lepidoptera genus database

Hadeninae